Tomića Brig is a village in Vinjani in the municipality of Posušje, Federation of Bosnia and Herzegovina, Bosnia and Herzegovina.

The name Tomića Brig comes from the surname of the majority of residents in the village (Tomić) and a local term for the hill on which the village is located. In addition to those with the surname Tomić, residents that carry different names, such as Lončar, Mandurić or Penava, also live in the village.

Populated places in Posušje